Chilean may refer to:

 Something of, from, or related to Chile, a country in South America
 Chilean people
 Chilean Spanish
 Chilean culture
 Chilean cuisine
 Chilean Americans

See also 
List of Chileans

Language and nationality disambiguation pages